Aryeh Lev Stollman is a writer and physician based in the United States. A neuroradiologist at Mount Sinai Medical Center in New York City, he has also published several works of fiction.

Early life
Born in Detroit, Michigan and raised in Windsor, Ontario, where his father was an Orthodox rabbi and professor and chairman of the English Department at the University of Windsor, Stollman studied at Yeshiva University and the Albert Einstein College of Medicine.

Works
He published his first novel, The Far Euphrates (Riverhead), in 1997. The book won the Lambda Literary Award for Gay Fiction at the 10th Lambda Literary Awards, as well as being named to year-end notable books lists by the American Library Association, the Los Angeles Times and the National Book Critics Circle. The Far Euphrates has been translated into German, Dutch, Italian, Portuguese and Hebrew. In the New York Times Book Review, Margot Livesey called The Far Euphrates "radiant . . . remarkable both for Stollman's eloquently understated prose and for the ease with which he constructs his artful plot . . .  At the heart of The Far Euphrates lie the vexed questions raised by the Holocaust and its legacy: how we must try to solve for ourselves the riddle of God's existence and cultivate a sense of mercy in an unforgiving age."

His second novel, The Illuminated Soul (Riverhead), was published in 2002 and won the Harold U. Ribalow Prize for Jewish literature from Hadassah Magazine, and his short story collection The Dialogues of Time and Entropy (Riverhead) was published in 2003.

His story "Lotte Returns!" was commissioned and broadcast by National Public Radio in 2008.

His third novel, Queen of Jerusalem, was published in 2020 by Aryeh Nir/Modan in Hebrew translation.

Stollman wrote the libretto for Tobias Picker's Awakenings, based on Oliver Sacks' 1973 chronicle of his efforts to help the victims of the encephalitis lethargica epidemic, which premiered at Opera Theatre of Saint Louis, conducted by Roberto Kalb and directed by James Robinson. The East Coast premiere of Awakenings was performed by Odyssey Opera in partnership with Boston Modern Orchestra Project, conducted by Gil Rose and directed by James Robinson, on February 25, 2023 at the newly renovated Huntington Theater.

He has also written the libretto for Lili Elbe, an opera composed by Tobias Picker, commissioned by Theater St. Gallen, which will premiere October 22, 2023 in Saint Gallen starring Heldenbaritonistin Lucia Lucas.

Private life
He is the husband of composer Tobias Picker.

Works
The Far Euphrates (1997)
The Illuminated Soul (2002)
The Dialogues of Time and Entropy (2003)

References

External links

1954 births
American radiologists
American male novelists
American short story writers
20th-century American novelists
21st-century American novelists
Canadian male novelists
Canadian male short story writers
20th-century Canadian novelists
21st-century Canadian novelists
Canadian gay writers
Jewish Canadian writers
Jewish American novelists
American LGBT novelists
Canadian LGBT novelists
LGBT Jews
LGBT people from Michigan
Writers from Detroit
Writers from Windsor, Ontario
Writers from New York City
Living people
Lambda Literary Award for Gay Fiction winners
LGBT physicians
American male short story writers
21st-century Canadian short story writers
20th-century Canadian male writers
21st-century Canadian male writers
Novelists from New York (state)
20th-century American male writers
21st-century American male writers
21st-century American Jews
21st-century Canadian LGBT people
American gay writers
Gay novelists
American opera librettists